The 2016 Auckland local board elections were held as part of the 2016 New Zealand local elections; 
145 members were elected to local boards.

Summary of Results

Excludes the Wairoa subdivision of Franklin

References

Auckland
2010s in Auckland